Ron Ward (born 1944) is a Canadian ice hockey player.

Ron Ward may also refer to:

 Ron Ward (cricketer) (1905–2000), Australian cricketer
 Ron Ward (footballer) (born 1932), English footballer
 Ronald Ward (1901–1978), British actor

See also
 Don Ward (disambiguation)